Nicolas Schnyder (born 9 June 1987) is a Swiss former professional road cyclist.

Major results

2005
 1st  Time trial, National Junior Road Championships
 2nd Overall Tour du Pays de Vaud
2007
 3rd Time trial, National Under-23 Road Championships
2008
 2nd Time trial, National Under-23 Road Championships
2009
 1st  Time trial, National Under-23 Road Championships
 8th Overall Tour de l'Avenir
 9th Overall Ronde de l'Isard
 10th Overall Grand Prix Tell
2010
 1st  Overall Tour des Pays de Savoie
1st Stage 1
 National Road Championships
4th Time trial
5th Road race
 5th Giro del Veneto
 7th Overall Cinturón a Mallorca
2011
 2nd Giro del Mendrisiotto

References

External links

1987 births
Living people
Swiss male cyclists
People from the canton of Geneva